Swastima Khadka (born 4 July 1995) is a Nepalese actress who predominantly works in Nepali cinema. She has appeared in Love Love Love (2017), Chhakka Panja 2 (2017), Nai Nabhannu La 5 (2018), and Bulbul (2019).

Khadka debuted as an actress in the 2015 teen romance Hostel Returns, for which she was nominated for the National Film Awards for Best Supporting Actress. This initial success was followed by a series of commercially successful films. After her debut, she appeared in the 2017 romantic drama Love Love Love, which received positive reviews from critics. In 2017, Khadka appeared in the social drama film Chhakka Panja 2, which became commercially successful, grossing 60 million Nepalese rupees within the first six days of release, and became the second highest-grossing Nepali film. That same year, Khadka starred in the drama film Bulbul. The film was selected as the Nepalese entry for the Best International Feature Film at the 92nd Academy Awards, but it was not nominated. Her performance in the film was met with critical acclaim.

Before venturing into Nepali cinema, she participated in Miss Teen Nepal at the age of 17. She has been married to Nischal Basnet since 2016.

Personal and early life 
Swastima Khadka was born on 4 July 1995 in Kathmandu, Nepal. She completed her School Leaving Certificate (SLC) from Birendra Sainik Awasiya Mahavidyalaya, Bhaktapur. Khadka holds a three-year diploma in architectural engineering from the Thapathali Campus. At the age of 17, she participated in the Nepali national beauty pageant Miss Teen Nepal. She told The Nepali Man that Miss Nepal was "a bit far-fetched for her" and described the experience as "a stepping stone" for her.

On 14 December 2015, Khadka and film director Nischal Basnet became engaged in the presence of close relatives. They married on 17 February 2016, in a private ceremony held at the Royal Events Banquet and Restaurant in Tinkune. The couple have been nicknamed "Rastryia Dai and Bhauju".

Career

2015–2017: Film debut 
In 2015, Khadka debuted as a film actress in Suraj Bhusal's Hostel Returns, where she starred alongside Sushil Shrestha, Najir Hussain, and Sunil Rawal. In the film, she played Alina, who is in a love triangle with two boys in her school. For Hostel Returns, she was nominated for Best Supporting Actress in the National Film Awards. For her second film, she appeared in Dipendra K. Khanal's romantic-drama Love Love Love (2017) where she portrayed Samriddhi, a girl whose childhood friend's love for her is not reciprocated. Her portrayal of Samriddhi was praised by critics, and The Himalayan Times wrote, "Khadka's act is appealing. Her body language, gestures and dialogue delivery are brilliant." Khadka also made a guest appearance in "Kutu Ma Kutu" (2017). Her appearance in the song was praised by audiences and critics. The reviewer for Nepali Sansar  wrote, "Swastima Khadka danced gracefully to this catchy Nepali number. Her sweet smile and performance will flash before us every time we listen to Kutu Ma Kutu". The song became the first Nepali music video to reach 100 million views on YouTube.

Later in 2017, Khadka appeared in Deepa Shree Niraula's social drama film Chhakka Panja 2. In the film, she plays Akansha, a student who wants to travel to Australia to study but struggles with the International English Language Testing System exam required to enter the country. The Kathmandu Post reported that Chhakka Panja 2 earned around 60 million Nepalese rupees within the first six days of release and went on to become the second highest-grossing Nepali film. When asked about her experience working with the cast members of Chhakka Panja 2, Khadka said, "Ah, I got to learn a lot! They have already been in the field for more than 20 years; they obviously know a lot more than I do. And not only did I learn stuff about movies while working with them, but also understand other areas like dealing with the media, interacting with them… everything! I admit, I get overshadowed by them sometimes but then, rather than a disadvantage, I like to think of it as an advantage to stay in the sideline and absorb what I can from them. After all, they are the superstars!".

2018–present: Nai Nabhannu La 5 and Bulbul 

In 2018, Khadka starred in Bikash Raj Acharya's romantic-drama Nai Nabhannu La 5, the fifth installment in the Nai Nabhannu La film series. In the film, Khadka plays Ranjana, a teenage girl who shares a romance with Neer, played by debutant actor Abhisek Nepal. Her performance was praised by Diwakar Pyakurel of Onlinekhabar, who wrote, "Khadka has acted as stubborn late teen; and she does it quite well." The film surpassed two crore (20 million) Nepalese rupees (approximately US$163,500 in 2020) in its first weekend. Later in the same year, Khadka had a minor role in the film Chhakka Panja 3 where she played the role of a Brahmin girl who becomes the love interest of a Janajati boy. Later, she appeared in Jai Bhole (2018) alongside Khagendra Lamichhane, Saugat Malla, and Buddhi Tamang. The film focuses on Jai (Khagendra Lamichhane) who falls for Nisha (Swastima Khadka), but Nisha's sworn brother interferes with them.

In 2019, Khadka appeared alongside Mukun Bhusal in Binod Paudel's drama film Bulbul. In the film, Khadka plays Ranakala, a student driver in Kathmandu. The film was selected as the Nepalese entry for the Best International Feature Film at the 92nd Academy Awards, but it was not nominated. About her performance, she told The Nepali Man, "Out of all my six movies, I received maximum appreciation [for] Bulbul. So this does mean that somewhere there is a solid part of [the] audience that [does] enjoy these independent movies. Bulbul went onto its fourth week. In this time, for any movie to run into its second week is a very good response. So, Bulbul being on its fourth is a huge feat in itself. That is why I am pretty sure that an audience who [does] understand such art movies is growing". Khadka's performance was met with critical acclaim. Prakriti Kandel, writing for Nepali Times, praised her, saying:

After Bulbul, Khadka appeared in Hajar Juni Samma, and Ghamad Shere the same year. In Hajar Juni Samma, Khadka plays Avantika, a medical student from Sikkim. Sunny Mahat of The Annapurna Express described the film as "a movie you’d want to watch with your female friends, just to see them cringe at the creepy old man trying to find a match for his son". Rupak Risal of Moviemandu wrote that Khadka had "done justice to [her] role". In Ghamad Shere, where Khadka starred as Gauri, an English teacher and sister-in-law of the main character Shere, played by Khadka's husband Nischal Basnet. Abhimanyu Dixit of The Kathmandu Post criticized the decision to cast Basnet and Khadka in the same film as siblings-in-law, writing, "To cast Swastima as a reel-life sister-in-law to her real-life husband Nischal might have seemed like a good idea, or something ‘different’ on paper, but it hardly works. Both actors try hard to be consistent with their respective characters but it's not enough to make us believe that they're anything except Nischal and Swastima, the real-life couple."

Filmography

Awards and nominations

References

External links 
 

1995 births
Living people
Actors from Kathmandu
Nepalese female models
Nepalese film actresses
Actresses in Nepali cinema
Actresses in Malayalam cinema
Nepalese expatriate actresses in India
Thapathali Campus alumni
21st-century Nepalese actresses
21st-century Nepalese dancers